Elachista laterina is a moth of the family Elachistidae. It is found in north-eastern Queensland.

The forewings are brown while it  hindwings are grey.

References

Moths described in 2011
Endemic fauna of Australia
laterina
Moths of Australia
Taxa named by Lauri Kaila